James Nicholas Tooley (born July 1959, in Southampton, England) is a professor of educational entrepreneurship and of education policy at the University of Buckingham. In July 2020 Tooley was appointed as the new Vice-Chancellor of the University of Buckingham, succeeding Sir Anthony Seldon from 1 October 2020.

Early life
Tooley's family moved to Bristol where he was educated at Kingsfield School, Kingswood.  The school was burnt to the ground during his time there.

Career background 
Tooley holds a PhD from the Institute of Education, University of London, an MSc from the Science Policy Research Unit, University of Sussex, and first class BSc honours in Logic and Mathematics, also from the University of Sussex.  He began his career as a mathematics teacher in Zimbabwe (1983 to 1986), before moving to the National Foundation for Educational Research in England in 1988. He held short-term appointments at Simon Fraser University, Canada, and the University of the Western Cape, South Africa, while completing his PhD. His first post-doctoral position was with the University of Oxford's Department of Educational Studies, under Professor Richard Pring. From Oxford he moved to the University of Manchester in 1995; at the same time he also created the Education and Training Unit at the Institute of Economic Affairs in London.

Tooly was professor at the University of Newcastle upon Tyne, where he directed the E. G. West Centre. For his research on private education for the poor in India, China and Africa, Tooley was awarded the gold prize in the first International Finance Corporation/Financial Times Private Sector Development Competition in September 2006. From 2007 to 2009, he was founding President of the Education Fund, Orient Global, and lived in Hyderabad, India. He is currently chairman of education companies in Ghana (Omega Schools Franchise Ltd) and India (Empathy Learning Systems Pvt Ltd) creating low cost chains of low cost private schools. He also holds an appointment as an Adjunct Scholar at the Cato Institute and serves on the Advisory Council of the Institute of Economic Affairs as well as on the Academic Advisory Council of Civitas: The Institute for the Study of Civil Society. He also serves on the Board of Visitors of Ralston College, a start-up liberal arts college in Savannah.

Low-cost private education 
Tooley is best known for his work on low cost private education. He began this work in 2000, having discovered for himself the existence of low cost private schools in the slums of Hyderabad while doing consultancy for the International Finance Corporation. A major research programme was subsequently undertaken between 2003 and 2005, funded by the John Templeton Foundation, exploring the nature and existence of private schools for the poor in India, Ghana, Nigeria, Kenya and China, and comparing public and private provision for the poor. This research is reported in a range of books and publications, including The Beautiful Tree: a personal journey into how the world's poorest people are educating themselves (Penguin, New Delhi, and Cato Institute, 2009). His work has also been profiled in documentaries for the BBC and PBS: for the latter it was featured alongside the work of Nobel Laureate Muhammad Yunus and Hernando de Soto Polar.

The basic findings of the research show that in urban and peri-urban poor areas (slums and shanty towns) in India and the African countries studied, the majority of schoolchildren are in low cost private schools. After testing 24,000 children, it was found that children in the low cost private schools significantly outperform children in public schools, after controlling for background variables and the school choice process.

In 2017 Tooley announced plans to open a low cost private primary school in Durham, England. The school opened in 2018. An Ofsted report in 2019 rated the school as "Good".

Educational philosophy and thought 
Tooley's work has also explored the role of government in education from philosophical and other theoretical perspectives. This has resulted in academic articles challenging the work of philosophers Harry Brighouse and Adam Swift, and in the major book E. G. West: economic liberalism and the role of government in education (Continuum Library of Educational Thought, 2008).

Prizes and awards 
The following are the major awards won by Tooley:
 Sir Antony Fisher Memorial Prize, for The Beautiful Tree, April 2010
 Gold Prize Winner, 1st Financial Times/International Finance Corporation, Private Sector Development Research Paper Competition, September 2006
 Templeton Prize for Free Market Solutions to Poverty, 1st Prize, March 2006
 Alexis de Tocqueville Award for the Advancement of Education Freedom, May 2007
 National Free Enterprise Award, Feb 2007

Publications 
The following are the books and monographs published by Tooley:
 Tooley, James (2016) Imprisoned in India: Corruption and Extortion in the World's Largest Democracy; Biteback Publishing; Great Britain
 Tooley, James (2009) The Beautiful Tree: a personal journey into how the world's poorest people are educating themselves. New Delhi: Penguin; Washington, DC: Cato Institute
 Tooley, James (2008) E. G. West: economic liberalism and the role of government in education (Continuum Library of Educational Thought). New York and London: Continuum
 Tooley, James & Dixon, Pauline (2005) Private Education is Good for the Poor: a study of private schools serving the poor in low-income countries, Washington DC: Cato Institute.
 Tooley, James & Dixon, Pauline (2005) Private Schools Serving the Poor: a study from Delhi, India. New Delhi: Centre for Civil Society
 Salisbury, David & Tooley, James (eds) (2005) What Americans Can Learn from School Choice in Other Countries. Washington, DC: Cato Institute
 Tooley, James (2004)  教育的全球化能够使穷人受益吗? (Could the Globalization of Education Benefit the Poor?), Beijing: 九鼎公共事务研究所 (Cathay Institute for Public Affairs) (in Chinese)
 Tooley, James (2004) 全球教育产业——发展中国家私立教育的经验教训 (The Global Education Industry); translated by Professor Qu Hengchang. Shanghai: People's Publishing House (in Chinese)
 Tooley, James (2003) Mehr Bildung für die Armen (Occasional Paper No. 3). Potsdam: Friedrich-Naumann-Stiftung
 Tooley, James & Stanfield, James (eds) (2003) Government Failure: E. G. West on education, London: Profile Books
 Tooley, James; Dixon, Pauline & Stanfield, James (2003) Delivering Better Education: market solutions to education London: Adam Smith Institute
 Tooley, James & Dixon, Pauline (2003) Private Schools for the Poor: a case study from India.  Reading: CfBT
 Tooley, James (2002) The Miseducation of Women. London and New York:Continuum
 Tooley, James (2001) The Global Education Industry; 2nd edition, London and Washington DC, Institute of Economic Affairs and International Finance Corporation, in association with Profile Books, London
 Tooley, James (ed.) (2001) Buckingham at 25: freeing the universities from state control.  London: Profile Books
 Tooley, James (2001) The Enterprise of Education: opportunities and challenges for India.  New Delhi: Liberty Institute
 Tooley, James (2000) Reclaiming Education. London: Cassell
 Tooley, James (1999) The Global Education Industry. London and Washington DC: Institute of Economic Affairs in association with International Finance Corporation
 Tooley, James with Howes, Andy (1999) The Seven Virtues of Highly Effective Schools. London:  TC Trust
 Tooley, James with Darby, Doug (1998) Educational Research: a critique London: Ofsted
 Seville, Adrian & Tooley, James (1997) The Debate on Higher Education: challenging the assumptions London: Institute of Economic Affairs
 Tooley, James (1996) Education without the State London: Institute of Economic Affairs
 Tooley, James (1995) Disestablishing the School Aldershot: Avebury Press
 Tooley, James (1993) A Market-Led Alternative for the Curriculum: breaking the code. London: Tufnell Press
 Mason, Keith & Tooley, James (1992) Moving Forward in Mathematics: a diagnostic teaching approach''. Windsor: NFER/Nelson

References

External links
 

1959 births
Living people
Academics of Newcastle University
Academics of the University of Buckingham
Alumni of the UCL Institute of Education
Alumni of the University of Sussex
British educational theorists
Writers from Southampton
Cato Institute people
People educated at King's Oak Academy